Samuel Hambleton may refer to:

Samuel Hambleton (United States Navy officer) (1777–1851 in Maryland), officer in the U.S. Navy who served during the War of 1812
Samuel Hambleton (Maryland congressman) (1812–1886), American politician